Mel Rubi is an artist best known for his comic book work.

Bibliography

Interiors

Pencils
Interior pencilling work includes:
 Aliens vs. Predator Annual (1999)
 Aliens vs. Predator vs. The Terminator #1 – #4 (2000)
 Aliens vs. Predator: Xenogenesis #1 – #4 (1999)
 All-New Official Handbook of the Marvel Universe A to Z #2, #3 (2007)
 Angel #1–4, 7, 10, 11, 15–17, 20 (2001)
 Deathblow #15–17, 26 (1993)
 Doctor Strange, Sorcerer Supreme #60–62, 64, 65, 68 (1988)
 Excalibur #115–118, 120 (1988)
 Faro Korbit #1-3 (2004)
 Gen13 Yearbook '97 (1997)
 Grifter #1–5 (1996)
 Kiss #1–6, 8–13, TPB #1–4 (2002)
 Marvel Legacy: The 1990s Handbook #1 (2007)
 Mike Baron's Detonator #1 (2004)
 Morbius, the Living Vampire #14 (1992)
 Predator: Xenogenesis #1–4 (1999)
 The Punisher War Journal #72–74, 76–78 (1988)
 Red Sonja #0–6, 8–18, TPB 01 (2005)
 Shadowman #20 (1992)
 Spider-Man/Red Sonja #1–5 (2007)
 Star Wars: The Bounty Hunters #2 (1999)
 Stormwatch #20 (1993)
 The Terminator: The Dark Years #1–3 (1999)
 The Uncanny X-Men #344–345, 397–398 (1963)
 Wetworks #25 (1994)
 What If? #110 (1989)
 Mindhunter #1–3 (2000)
 Wolverine #127 (1988)
 X-Factor #138 (1986)
 X-Man #51 (1995)
 X-Men Unlimited #16 (1993)

Inks
 Red Sonja #0–6, 8–18 (2005)
 Spider-Man/Red Sonja #4–5 (2007)

Covers

 Angel #1–4 (2001)
 Army of Darkness vs. Re-Animator TPB #3 (2005)
 Backlash #16–17 (1994)
 Doctor Strange, Sorcerer Supreme #60–62, 67 (1988)
 Excalibur #120 (1988)
 Giant Size Red Sonja (2007)
 Grifter #1–5 (1996)
 Kiss #4–6, 8–13 (2002)
 Mike Baron's Detonator #1 (2004)
 Predator: Xenogenesis #1–4 (1999)
 The Punisher War Journal #72–74 (1988)
 Red Sonja #0–6, 8–18, 21, 25–29 (2005)
 Savage Tales #1 (2007)
 Sword of Red Sonja: Doom of the Gods #1, 2, 4 (2007)
 The Uncanny X-Men Annual 1998 (1998)
 X-Men Unlimited (1993)

References

Living people
American comics artists
Year of birth missing (living people)